The Hellenic Financial Stability Fund, or HFSF is a Greek special purpose vehicle created to help stabilize the Greek banking sector amidst the Greek government-debt crisis.

Formation
Based in Athens, the HFSF was founded in July 2010 under Law 3864/2010 as a state-owned private legal entity with the purpose to "contribute to the maintenance of the stability of the Greek banking system, for the sake of public interest". It began its operation on 30 September 2010 with the appointment of the members of the fund's Board of Directors.

The fund has been seeded by the European Financial Stability Facility (EFSF) with 50 billion euros to recapitalize Greece's banks.

Management

Originally governed by a Board of Directors, on 30 January 2013, the fund's management was reorganized into a two-tier management structure, consisting of the General Council and the Executive Board. While Anastasia Sakellariou was appointed Managing Director, or CEO, as part of the Executive Board, Paul Koster became Chairman of the General Council. Koster however resigned on 15 March 2013 and was replaced by Christos Sclavounis.

Following the January 2015 legislative election, the new SYRIZA government was expected to replace Sclavounis by Panagiotis Roumeliotis, while Sakellariou would remain Managing Director. Shortly thereafter, Sclavounis indeed resigned from his office as Chairman.

Sakellariou (Chief Executive Director of the HFSF between 2013 and 2015) had to be asked by the Greek government to step down from its position in May 2015 as she was charged, alongside other 25 former executives of the Hellenic Post Bank, with committing fraud and money laundering.

Operations

During the first year and half after its creation, the HFSF had capital for €1.5 billion. During this time the only bank receiving funds from it was New Proton.

In spring 2013, the HFSF together with the Bank of Greece led the merger of ten Greek banks into four "systemic" banks.

By early 2015, the HFSF kept a remaining buffer of 11 billion euros in EFSF bonds that the outgoing Greek government had intended to repurpose as a precautionary credit line. In February 2015, the new, SYRIZA-led administration negotiated with the Troika over a six-month extension of the Master Financial Assistance Facility Agreement. The administration proposed repurposing the remaining funds for Keynesian anti-cyclical investments in the non-banking economic sector. The Eurogroup however insisted that the remaining buffer "can only be used for bank recapitalisation and resolution costs".

National Bank of Greece
In 2014 HFSF had a representative (Independent Non-Executive Member) in the board of directors of National Bank of Greece.

Alpha Bank
HFSF has a representative (non-executive member) in the board of directors of Alpha Bank (12 May 2015); this representative is a member of the Risk Management Committee of the bank, the Audit Committee, the Remuneration Committee and the Corporate Governance and Nominations Committee.

Eurobank-Ergasias S.A. 
HFSF has a representative (non-executive director) in the board of directors of the bank Eurobank Ergasias (13 May 2015).

Pireaus Bank
HFSF has a representative in the board of directors of Piraeus Bank (2015).

HFSF had the option to €2 billion of perpetual bonds into Piraeus Bank shares in December 2022. As of November 2020, the total market capitalization of the bank was less than €500 million. The conversion was triggered in November 2020, giving HFSF a further 35 % share of the bank, worth less than 200 million euro, a paper loss of over 1.5 billion euro.

References

 Literature

External links
 —−

Financial services companies of Greece
Government-owned companies of Greece
Companies based in Athens
Financial services companies established in 2010
2010 establishments in Greece
Greek government-debt crisis
Athens Exchange